The Thirteenth Commandment is a 1920 American silent drama film directed by Robert G. Vignola and written by Alice Eyton. The film stars Ethel Clayton, Charles Meredith, Monte Blue, Anna Q. Nilsson, Irving Cummings and Winter Hall. It is based on the 1916 novel The Thirteenth Commandment by Rupert Hughes. The film was released on January 17, 1920, by Paramount Pictures. It is not known whether the film currently survives.

Cast
Ethel Clayton as Daphne Kip
Charles Meredith as Clay Wimborn
Monte Blue as Bayard Kip
Anna Q. Nilsson as Leila Kip
Irving Cummings as Thomas Warwick Duane
Winter Hall as Roger Kip Sr.
Lucille Ward as Mrs. Kip Sr.
Arthur Maude as Mr. Wtherell
Beverly Travers as Sheila Kemble
Louis Morrison as Herman Reben 
Jane Wolfe	as Mrs. Chivvis

References

External links 

 

1920 films
1920s English-language films
Silent American drama films
1920 drama films
Paramount Pictures films
Films directed by Robert G. Vignola
American black-and-white films
Films based on works by Rupert Hughes
American silent feature films
1920s American films